On 18 September 2004 the British Daily Telegraph ran two articles titled "Secret papers show Blair was warned of Iraq chaos" and 'Failure is not an option, but it doesn't mean they will avoid it' by reporter Michael Smith, revealing the contents of six leaked British government documents – labelled "secret" or "confidential" – concerning the lead-up to the war in Iraq.   

The documents achieved recognition in the US press nine months later, on 18 June 2005, when the Associated Press (AP) published full typed copies of all six papers on its website.  The copies were provided by the British reporter, who said he had destroyed the original documents to protect his sources.  An anonymous senior British official said the documents appeared authentic.

Contents
AP reported that the memos show: "When Prime Minister Tony Blair's chief foreign policy adviser dined with Condoleezza Rice six months after the 11 September attacks, the then-US national security adviser didn't want to discuss Osama bin Laden or al-Qaida. She wanted to talk about 'regime change' in Iraq, setting the stage for the U.S.-led invasion more than a year later."

British Foreign Office political director Peter Ricketts said in one of the memos. "For Iraq, 'regime change' does not stack up. It sounds like a grudge between Bush and Saddam," Ricketts said. (See April 1993 for Saddam's attempted assassination of Bush's father.)

The memos express concern about breaking international law, but Blair is shown as being determined to go to war as Bush's ally regardless.

Tony Dodge, an Iraq expert at the University of London, said, "The documents show what official inquiries in Britain already have, that the case of weapons of mass destruction was based on thin intelligence and was used to inflate the evidence to the level of mendacity. In going to war with Bush, Blair defended the special relationship between the two countries, like other British leaders have. But he knew he was taking a huge political risk at home. He knew the war's legality was questionable and its unpopularity was never in doubt." Dodge also said the memos show that Blair was aware that postwar instability in Iraq was likely.

In one of the memos, David Manning, who was Blair's chief foreign policy adviser, reported on a meeting in Washington, D.C., with Rice;

It is clear that Bush is grateful for your [Blair's] support and has registered that you are getting flak. I said that you would not budge in your support for regime change but you had to manage a press, a Parliament and a public opinion that was very different from anything in the States. And you would not budge either in your insistence that, if we pursued regime change, it must be very carefully done and produce the right result. Failure was not an option.

I told Condi that we realized that the [Bush] administration could go it alone ... But if it wanted company, it would have to take account of its potential coalition partners. In particular:

The UN dimension.  The issue of the weapons inspectors must be handled in a way that would persuade European and wider opinion that the U.S. was conscious of the international framework, and the insistence of many countries on the need for a legal base.  Renewed refusal by Saddam to accept unfettered inspections would be a powerful argument.

After a lunch with Paul Wolfowitz, Sir Christopher Meyer wrote a private letter to Manning:
On Iraq I opened by sticking very closely to the script that you used with Condi Rice last week.  We backed regime change, but the plan had to be clever and failure was not an option... The US could go it alone if it wanted to.  But if it wanted to act with partners, there had to be a strategy for building support for military action against Saddam.  I then went through the need to wrongfoot Saddam on the inspectors and the UN security council resolutions and the critical importance of the Middle East peace plan.

A 22 March memo from Ricketts to Foreign Secretary Jack Straw said,

But even the best survey of Iraq's WMD programmes will not show much advance in recent years on the nuclear, missile or CW/BW (chemical or biological weapons) fronts: the programmes are extremely worrying but have not, as far as we know, been stepped up.

U.S. scrambling to establish a link between Iraq and al-Qaida is so far frankly unconvincing.  To get public and Parliamentary support for military action, we have to be convincing that: the threat is so serious/imminent that it is worth sending our troops to die for; it is qualitatively different from the threat posed by other proliferators who are closer to achieving nuclear capability (including Iran).

Documents 
 Overseas and Defence Secretariat, Cabinet Office, "Iraq: Options Paper", 8 March 2002 (pdf)
 David Manning, letter to Prime Minister on dinner with Condoleezza Rice, 14 March 2002 (pdf)
 Christopher Meyer, note on Sunday lunch with Paul Wolfowitz, to David Manning, 18 March 2002 (pdf)
 Peter Ricketts, letter to Jack Straw, 22 March 2002 (pdf)
 Jack Straw, letter to the Prime Minister, 25 March 2002 (pdf)
 Foreign Office Legal Briefing (pdf)
pre-Downing Street memo, also known as DSM II (Letter to Ministers: IRAQ: CONDITIONS FOR MILITARY ACTION), 21 July 2002 
Downing Street memo, 23 July 2002 
Goldsmith memo, 7 March 2003 
Deputy Legal Advisor to the Foreign Office – letter of resignation, 18 March 2003

See also 
 Downing Street memo
 Office of Special Plans
 Operation Southern Focus
 David Kelly
 September Dossier
 Dodgy Dossier
 Declaration of war by the United States
 Executive Order 13233
 Executive Order 13303
 Governments' pre-war positions on invasion of Iraq
 The UN Security Council and the Iraq war
 Resignations of UK cabinet ministers Robin Cook and Clare Short
 Legal opinion on war by UK Attorney General
Bush-Blair memo

External links

News sources
Michael Smith, "Secret papers show Blair was warned of Iraq chaos". The Daily Telegraph, 18 September 2004
Michael Smith, "'Failure is not an option, but it doesn't mean they will avoid it'". The Daily Telegraph, 18 September 2004
Richard Norton-Taylor, "The need to wrongfoot Saddam". The Guardian, 21 September 2004
Larisa Alexandrovna,  "DSM Resolution of Inquiry" Raw Story. 25 May 2005.     "Path of War Timeline" Raw Story.  25 May 2005. "How We Confirmed DSM" Raw Story. 14 June 2005 "Senate leaders demand answers on DSM" Raw Story. 24 June 2005.
 John Daniszewski, New Memos Detail Early Plans for Invading Iraq, Los Angeles Times, 15 June 2005.
 Michael Isikoff and Mark Hosenball, "New leaked memos are raising further questions about whether the Bush administration ‘fixed’ its intel to justify the Iraq war.", Newsweek/MSNBC, 15 June 2005
Thomas Wagner, "Memos Show British Concern Over Iraq Plans".  Associated Press, 18 June 2005
The Tribune "Bush motives on Iraq suspect again". tribuneindia.com, 18 June 2005
 Wikinews article on AP release. 18 June 2005

Other resources
 AfterDowningStreet.org: Advocacy site and document clearinghouse

2004 in the United Kingdom
2005 in American politics
Causes and prelude of the Iraq War
Political scandals in the United Kingdom
Stances and opinions regarding the Iraq War
Telegraph Media Group